KRAO-FM (102.5 FM), also known as myRadio 102.5, is a hot adult contemporary radio station broadcasting in the Palouse region of Northern Idaho and Eastern Washington. Licensed to Colfax, Washington, United States, the station is currently owned by Inland Northwest Broadcasting, LLC.

History
The station went on the air as KRAO-FM on November 29, 1989.

References

External links

RAO-FM
Hot adult contemporary radio stations in the United States
Radio stations established in 1989